CTW may refer to:

 Carat (mass) total weight, related to diamond jewellery
 CentralWorld, a shopping mall complex in Thailand
 Change to Win Federation, the former name of the Strategic Organizing Center, a group of United States labor unions
 Children's Television Workshop, former name of Sesame Workshop
 Computer Technology Workshop activity at the Joint Statistical Meetings
 Context tree weighting, a lossless compression and prediction algorithm
 Crypt The Warchild, an American rapper
 West TV, with the callsign CTW-32